Dodge City, Kansas is a center of media in southwestern Kansas. The following is a list of media outlets based in the city.

Print

Newspapers
The Dodge City Daily Globe, daily
The Southwest Kansas Register, weekly, published by the Roman Catholic Diocese of Dodge City

Magazines
High Plains Journal, weekly

Radio
The following radio stations are licensed to and/or broadcast from Dodge City:

AM

FM

Television
Dodge City is in the Wichita-Hutchinson, Kansas television market. The following television stations are licensed to and/or broadcast from Dodge City:

References

Dodge City, Kansas
Mass media in Kansas